Uzbekistan was one of the twenty-four participating countries and regions competing in the first Turkvision scheduled to take place between the 17 and 21 December 2013.

History
Uzbekistan made their debut in the Turkvision Song Contests at the  festival, in Eskişehir, Turkey. The contest was not broadcast on television in Uzbekistan. Nilufar Usmonova was selected internally to represent Uzbekistan in Turkey, it had previously been announced that Shahzoda would represent Uzbekistan with the song "Medlenno" (Медленно).

On 22 July 2015 Uzbekistan confirmed participation in the contest, Tarona Records were announced as being in charge of Uzbek participation. Aziza Nizamova was announced on 3 November 2014, she sang "Dunyo boʻlsin omon" (Дунё бўлсин омон).

Participation overview

References 

Turkvision
Countries in the Turkvision Song Contest